The U.S. Federal Reserve Police is the law enforcement unit of the Federal Reserve System, the central banking system of the United States.

History

Similar to other federal agencies, Federal Reserve officers are able to arrest without warrant for any federal felony or misdemeanor committed in their presence, or for federal felonies with probable cause anywhere within the United States. 

Prior to designation as federal law enforcement officers, system protection personnel operated as protection or special police officers in their respective states and were generally regulated to exercising authority on Federal Reserve property, with variances dependent on specific district regulations. Prior to federal law enforcement designation, there were no plainclothes or specialized units in the System.

Functions 
Each Federal Reserve law enforcement office in the twelve regional districts is an independent law enforcement unit, though governed loosely out of Washington, D.C..

The primary duty of uniformed division officers is to provide security and general law enforcement services for Federal Reserve facilities, personnel and operations. Each Federal Reserve district operates a 24/7 emergency communications (command) center. Some Federal Reserve districts employ sworn officer intelligence analysts while others utilize non-sworn civilians.

There are five Special Response Teams (SRT) based in San Francisco, Minneapolis, Atlanta, Richmond, as well as New York City, which are designed to respond nationwide. Additionally, Explosive Detector Dog teams are utilized at several facilities.  Each district maintains Executive Protection personnel, capable of safeguarding Federal Reserve executives throughout the United States.

Each branch, or field office, also maintains officers authorized by federal or state agencies (POST) to provide defensive tactics, firearms, and general instructor capabilities to their respective units.

Equipment 
Officers are certified to carry a variety of weapons systems, including semi-automatic pistols, assault rifles, and submachine guns.  They also carry less lethal weapons including pepper spray, batons, tasers, and other standard police equipment. Officers also wear body armor in both covert and overt forms. 

On October 12, 2010, President Barack Obama signed into law S.B. 1132 "Law Enforcement Officers' Safety Act Improvements Act", which states that law enforcement officers of the Federal Reserve are "qualified law enforcement officers" and thus are authorized to carry a firearm off-duty. This update to the Law Enforcement Safety Act, among other aspects, clarified that federal law enforcement officers working for Amtrak and the Federal Reserve (not funded by Congress) are specifically granted the same rights as publicly funded law enforcement officers as it relates to off-duty concealed carry.

Each district can choose the make, model and style of police vehicles, which vary based on location and weather. There are both marked and unmarked police cars in the Federal Reserve fleet.

Employment 
Federal Reserve Law Enforcement Officers (FRLEOs) must complete a Federal Law Enforcement Training Accreditation (FLETA) approved Basic Law Enforcement Course, or BLEC, in addition to field training. FRLEOs are required to complete in-service training each year to maintain their Federal Law Enforcement designation. Some (but not all) districts offer a lateral entry program that allows certification with minimal training for those with prior police training and experience. 

Because the Federal Reserve System is independent of the federal government, Federal Reserve Law Enforcement Officers have a benefits system separate from, but very similar to, federal employees, offering both pension and retirement. 
Each district has a different pay scale based on the local cost of living index. The average entry level uniformed officer earns compensation comparable to a GS-9 on the public federal pay scale, which is variable depending on location of assignment. Officers typically receive shift differential, and in some cases specialized duty pay, such as canine, executive protection, SRT, background investigator, or FTO pay.

Fallen officers

Since the establishment of the Federal Reserve Police, two officers have been killed in the line of duty.

Fallen dog

One dog has died while on duty.
K9 Remi EOW: January 13, 2014.

See also

 List of United States federal law enforcement agencies
 United States Mint Police

Citations

General sources 
 Federal Reserve Police Accreditation (FLETA)
 Federal Reserve Police and other Federal Agencies FLETA Accreditation
 Federal Reserve Police Recruiting page

Government agencies established in 2001
Police
Federal Reserve Police
Federal law enforcement agencies of the United States
Agency-specific police departments of the United States
2001 establishments in the United States

fr:Federal Reserve Police